Pleuraspidotheriidae is a family of "condylarths" that lived in Europe from the Palaeocene to the Mid Eocene.

References

Condylarths
Paleocene mammals
Eocene extinctions
Prehistoric mammal families
Eocene mammals